

Events

Pre-1600
 307 – After divorcing his wife Minervina, Constantine marries Fausta, daughter of the retired Roman emperor Maximian.
1146 – Bernard of Clairvaux preaches his famous sermon in a field at Vézelay, urging the necessity of a Second Crusade. Louis VII is present, and joins the Crusade.
1492 – Queen Isabella of Castile issues the Alhambra Decree, ordering her 150,000 Jewish and Muslim subjects to convert to Christianity or face expulsion.
1521 – Ferdinand Magellan and fifty of his men came ashore to present-day Limasawa to participate in the first Catholic mass in the Philippines.

1601–1900
1657 – The Long Parliament presents the Humble Petition and Advice offering Oliver Cromwell the British throne, which he eventually declines. 
1717 – A sermon on "The Nature of the Kingdom of Christ" by Benjamin Hoadly, the Bishop of Bangor, preached in the presence of King George I of Great Britain, provokes the Bangorian Controversy.
1761 – The 1761 Lisbon earthquake strikes off the Iberian Peninsula with an estimated magnitude of 8.5, six years after another quake destroyed the city.
1774 – American Revolution: The Kingdom of Great Britain orders the port of Boston, Massachusetts closed pursuant to the Boston Port Act.
1814 – The Sixth Coalition occupies Paris after Napoleon's Grande Armée capitulates. 
1854 – Commodore Matthew Perry signs the Convention of Kanagawa with the Tokugawa Shogunate, opening the ports of Shimoda and Hakodate to American trade.
1885 – The United Kingdom establishes the Bechuanaland Protectorate.
1889 – The Eiffel Tower is officially opened.
1899 – Malolos, capital of the First Philippine Republic, is captured by American forces.

1901–present
1901 – Rusalka by Antonín Dvořák premieres at the National Opera House in Prague.
1905 – Kaiser Wilhelm II of Germany declares his support for Moroccan independence in Tangier, beginning the First Moroccan Crisis.
1906 – The Intercollegiate Athletic Association of the United States (later the National Collegiate Athletic Association) is established to set rules for college sports in the United States.
1909 – Serbia formally withdraws its opposition to Austro-Hungarian actions in the Bosnian Crisis.
1913 – The Vienna Concert Society rioted during a performance of modernist music by Arnold Schoenberg, Alban Berg, Alexander von Zemlinsky, and Anton von Webern, causing a premature end to the concert due to violence; this concert became known as the Skandalkonzert.
1917 – According to the terms of the Treaty of the Danish West Indies, the islands become American possessions.
1918 – Massacre of ethnic Azerbaijanis is committed by allied armed groups of Armenian Revolutionary Federation and Bolsheviks. Nearly 12,000 Azerbaijani Muslims are killed.
  1918   – Daylight saving time goes into effect in the United States for the first time.
1921 – The Royal Australian Air Force is formed.
1930 – The Motion Picture Production Code is instituted, imposing strict guidelines on the treatment of sex, crime, religion and violence in film, in the U.S., for the next thirty-eight years.
1931 – An earthquake in Nicaragua destroys Managua; killing 2,000.
  1931   – A Transcontinental & Western Air airliner crashes near Bazaar, Kansas, killing eight, including University of Notre Dame head football coach Knute Rockne.
1933 – The Civilian Conservation Corps is established with the mission of relieving rampant unemployment in the United States.
1939 – Events preceding World War II in Europe: Prime Minister Neville Chamberlain pledges British military support to the Second Polish Republic in the event of an invasion by Nazi Germany. 
1942 – World War II: Japanese forces invade Christmas Island, then a British possession.
1945 – World War II: A defecting German pilot delivers a Messerschmitt Me 262A-1, the world's first operational jet-powered fighter aircraft, to the Americans, the first to fall into Allied hands.
1949 – The Dominion of Newfoundland joins the Canadian Confederation and becomes the 10th Province of Canada.
1951 – Remington Rand delivers the first UNIVAC I computer to the United States Census Bureau.
1957 – Elections to the Territorial Assembly of the French colony Upper Volta are held. After the elections PDU and MDV form a government.
1958 – In the Canadian federal election, the Progressive Conservatives, led by John Diefenbaker, win the largest percentage of seats in Canadian history, with 208 seats of 265.
1959 – The 14th Dalai Lama, crosses the border into India and is granted political asylum.
1964 – Brazilian General Olímpio Mourão Filho orders his troops to move towards Rio de Janeiro, beginning the coup d'état and 21 years of military dictatorship.
1966 – The Soviet Union launches Luna 10 which later becomes the first space probe to enter orbit around the Moon.
  1966   – The Labour Party under Harold Wilson wins the 1966 United Kingdom general election.
1968 – American President Lyndon B. Johnson speaks to the nation of "Steps to Limit the War in Vietnam" in a television address. At the conclusion of his speech, he announces: "I shall not seek, and I will not accept, the nomination of my party for another term as your President."
1970 – Explorer 1 re-enters the Earth's atmosphere after 12 years in orbit.
1980 – The Chicago, Rock Island and Pacific Railroad operates its final train after being ordered to liquidate its assets because of bankruptcy and debts owed to creditors.
1990 – Approximately 200,000 protesters take to the streets of London to protest against the newly introduced Poll Tax.
1991 – Georgian independence referendum: Nearly 99 percent of the voters support the country's independence from the Soviet Union.
  1991   – The Warsaw Pact formally disbands. 
1992 – The , the last active United States Navy battleship, is decommissioned in Long Beach, California.
  1992   – The Treaty of Federation is signed in Moscow.
1993 – The Macao Basic Law is adopted by the Eighth National People's Congress of China to take effect December 20, 1999. Resumption by China of the Exercise of Sovereignty over Macao
1995 – Selena is murdered by her fan club president Yolanda Saldívar at a Days Inn in Corpus Christi, Texas.
  1995   – TAROM Flight 371, an Airbus A310-300, crashes near Balotesti, Romania, killing all 60 people on board.
1998 – Netscape releases Mozilla source code under an open source license.
2004 – Iraq War in Anbar Province: In Fallujah, Iraq, four American private military contractors working for Blackwater USA, are killed after being ambushed.
2016 – NASA astronaut Scott Kelly and Roscosmos cosmonaut Mikhail Kornienko return to Earth after a yearlong mission at the International Space Station.
2018 – Start of the 2018 Armenian revolution.

Births

Pre-1600
1360 – Philippa of Lancaster (d. 1415)
1499 – Pope Pius IV (d. 1565)
1504 – Guru Angad, Indian religious leader (d. 1552)
1519 – Henry II of France (d. 1559)
1536 – Ashikaga Yoshiteru, Japanese shōgun (d. 1565)
1596 – René Descartes, French mathematician and philosopher (d. 1650)

1601–1900
1601 – Jakov Mikalja, Italian linguist and lexicographer (d. 1654)
1621 – Andrew Marvell, English poet and politician (d. 1678)
1651 – Charles II, Elector Palatine, German husband of Princess Wilhelmine Ernestine of Denmark (d. 1685)
1675 – Pope Benedict XIV (d. 1758)
1685 – Johann Sebastian Bach (d. 1750) 
1718 – Mariana Victoria of Spain (d. 1781)
1723 – Frederick V of Denmark (d. 1766)
1730 – Étienne Bézout, French mathematician and theorist (d. 1783)
1732 – Joseph Haydn, Austrian pianist and composer (d. 1809)
1740 – Panoutsos Notaras, Greek politician (d. 1849)
1747 – Johann Abraham Peter Schulz, German pianist and composer (d. 1800)
1777 – Charles Cagniard de la Tour, French physicist and engineer (d. 1859)
1778 – Coenraad Jacob Temminck, Dutch zoologist and ornithologist (d. 1858)
1794 – Thomas McKean Thompson McKennan, American lawyer and politician, 2nd United States Secretary of the Interior (d. 1852)
1809 – Edward FitzGerald, English poet and translator (d. 1883)
  1809   – Otto Lindblad, Swedish composer (d. 1864)
1813 – Félix María Zuloaga, Mexican general and unconstitutional interim president (1858 and 1860–1862) (d. 1898)
1819 – Chlodwig, Prince of Hohenlohe-Schillingsfürst (d. 1901)
1823 – Mary Boykin Chesnut, American author (d. 1886)
1833 – Mary Abigail Dodge, American writer and essayist (d. 1896)
1835 – John La Farge, American artist (d. 1910)
1847 – Hermann de Pourtalès, Swiss sailor (d. 1904)
  1847   – Yegor Ivanovich Zolotarev, Russian mathematician and theorist (d. 1878)
1851 – Francis Bell, New Zealand lawyer and politician, 20th Prime Minister of New Zealand (d. 1936)
1855 – Alfred E. Hunt, American businessman (d. 1899)
1859 – Emil Fenyvessy, Hungarian actor and screenwriter (d. 1924) 
1865 – Anandi Gopal Joshi, Indian physician (d. 1887)
1871 – Arthur Griffith, Irish journalist and politician, 3rd President of Dáil Éireann (d. 1922)
1872 – Sergei Diaghilev, Russian ballet manager and critic, founded the Ballets Russes (d. 1929)
1874 – Benjamín G. Hill, Mexican revolutionary general, governor of Sonora (d. 1920)
  1874   – Henri Marteau, French violinist and composer (d. 1934)
1876 – Borisav Stanković, Serbian author (d. 1927)
1878 – Jack Johnson, American boxer (d. 1946)
1884 – Adriaan van Maanen, Dutch-American astronomer and academic (d. 1946)
1885 – Pascin, Bulgarian-American painter and illustrator (d. 1930)
1890 – Ben Adams, American jumper (d. 1961)
  1890   – William Lawrence Bragg, Australian-English physicist and academic, Nobel Prize laureate (d. 1971)
1891 – Victor Varconi, Hungarian-American actor and director (d. 1976)
1893 – Clemens Krauss, Austrian conductor and manager (d. 1954)
  1893   – Herbert Meinhard Mühlpfordt, German physician and historian (d. 1982)
1895 – Vardis Fisher, American author and academic (d. 1968)
1900 – Prince Henry, Duke of Gloucester (d. 1974)

1901–present
1904 – Harald Berglund, Swedish cinematographer (d. 1980)
1905 – Robert Stevenson, English director and screenwriter (d. 1986)
  1905   – George Treweek, Australian rugby league player (d. 1991)
1906 – Sin-Itiro Tomonaga, Japanese physicist and academic, Nobel Prize laureate (d. 1979)
1908 – Red Norvo, American vibraphone player and composer (d. 1999)
1911 – Freddie Green, American guitarist (d. 1987)
  1911   – Elisabeth Grümmer, German soprano (d. 1986)
1912 – William Lederer, American soldier and author (d. 2009)
1913 – Etta Baker, African-American singer and guitarist (d. 2006)
1914 – Octavio Paz, Mexican poet and diplomat, Nobel Prize laureate (d. 1998)
  1914   – Dagmar Lange, Swedish author (d. 1991)
1915 – Albert Hourani, English historian and author (d. 1993)
  1915   – Shoichi Yokoi, Japanese sergeant (d. 1997)
1916 – Lucille Bliss, American voice actress (d. 2012)
  1916   – Tommy Bolt, American golfer (d. 2008)
  1916   – John H. Wood, Jr., American lawyer and judge (d. 1979)
1917 – Dorothy DeLay, American violinist and educator (d. 2002)
1918 – Ted Post, American director (d. 2013)
1919 – Frank Akins, American football player (d. 1993)
1920 – Deborah Cavendish, Duchess of Devonshire, British aristocrat, socialite and author (d. 2014)
1921 – Lowell Fulson, African-American blues singer-songwriter and guitarist (d. 1999)
  1921   – Peggy Rea, American actress and casting director (d. 2011)
1922 – Richard Kiley, American actor and singer (d. 1999)
  1922   – Patrick Magee, Irish actor (d. 1982)
1923 – Don Barksdale, American basketball player (d. 1993)
  1923   – François Sermon, Belgian footballer (d. 2013)
1924 – Leo Buscaglia, American author and academic (d. 1998)
  1924   – Charles Guggenheim, American director and producer (d. 2002)
1925 – Jean Coutu, Canadian actor and director (d. 1999)
1926 – John Fowles, English novelist (d. 2005)
  1926   – Beni Montresor, Italian director, set designer, author, and illustrator (d. 2001)
  1926   – Rocco Petrone, American colonel and engineer (d. 2006)
1927 – Cesar Chavez, American labor union leader and activist (d. 1993)
  1927   – William Daniels, American actor
  1927   – Eduardo Martínez Somalo, Spanish cardinal (d. 2021)
  1927   – Vladimir Ilyushin, Russian pilot (d. 2010)
  1927   – Elmer Diedtrich, American businessman and politician (d. 2013)
  1927   – Bud MacPherson, Canadian ice hockey player (d. 1988)
1928 – Lefty Frizzell, American singer-songwriter and guitarist (d. 1975)
  1928   – Gordie Howe, Canadian ice hockey player (d. 2016)
1929 – Liz Claiborne, Belgian-American fashion designer, founded Liz Claiborne Inc. (d. 2007)
  1929   – Bert Fields, American lawyer and author
1930 – Yehuda Nir, Polish-American psychiatrist (d. 2014)
  1930   – Jim Mutscheller, American football player and coach (d. 2015)
1931 – Miller Barber, American golfer (d. 2013)
  1931   – Tamara Tyshkevich, Belarusian shot putter (d. 1997)
1932 – John Jakes, American author (d. 2023)
  1932   – Nagisa Oshima, Japanese director and screenwriter (d. 2013)
1933 – Anita Carter, American singer-songwriter and bassist  (d. 1999)
  1933   – Nichita Stănescu, Romanian poet (d. 1983)
1934 – Richard Chamberlain, American actor
  1934   – Shirley Jones, American actress and singer
  1934   – John D. Loudermilk, American singer-songwriter and guitarist (d. 2016)
  1934   – Grigory Nelyubov, Soviet pilot and cosmonaut (d. 1966)
  1934   – Carlo Rubbia, Italian physicist and academic, Nobel Prize laureate
  1934   – Kamala Surayya, Indian poet and author (d. 2009)
1935 – Herb Alpert, American singer-songwriter, trumpet player, and producer
  1935   – Judith Rossner, American author (d. 2005)
1936 – Marge Piercy, American poet and novelist
  1936   – Walter E. Williams, American economist and academic (d. 2020)
1938 – Patrick Bateson, English biologist and academic (d. 2017)
  1938   – Sheila Dikshit, Indian politician, 22nd Governor of Kerala (d. 2019)
  1938   – Antje Gleichfeld, German runner
  1938   – Bill Hicke, Canadian ice hockey player, coach, and manager (d. 2005)
  1938   – Jimmy Johnson, American football player
  1938   – Tõnno Lepmets, Estonian basketball player (d. 2005)
  1938   – Arthur B. Rubinstein, American pianist, composer, and conductor (d. 2018)
  1938   – David Steel, Scottish academic and politician
1939 – Zviad Gamsakhurdia, Georgian anthropologist and politician, 1st President of Georgia (d. 1993)
  1939   – Israel Horovitz, American actor, director, and screenwriter (d. 2020)
  1939   – Walker David Miller, American lawyer and judge (d. 2013)
  1939   – Volker Schlöndorff, German director and producer
  1939   – Karl-Heinz Schnellinger, German footballer
1940 – Brian Ackland-Snow, English production designer and art director (d. 2013)
  1940   – Barney Frank, American lawyer and politician
  1940   – Patrick Leahy, American lawyer and politician
1941 – Franco Bonvicini, Italian author and illustrator (d. 1995)
  1941   – Faith Leech, Australian swimmer (d. 2013)
1942 – Ulla Hoffmann, Swedish politician
  1942   – Hugh McCracken, American guitarist and producer (d. 2013)
  1942   – Michael Savage, American far-right radio host and author
1943 – Roy Andersson, Swedish director and screenwriter
  1943   – Deirdre Clancy, English costume designer
  1943   – Christopher Walken, American actor 
1944 – Pascal Danel, French singer-songwriter
  1944   – Angus King, American politician
  1944   – Mick Ralphs, English singer-songwriter and guitarist 
1945 – Edwin Catmull, American computer scientist and engineer
  1945   – Gabe Kaplan, American actor and comedian
  1945   – Myfanwy Talog, Welsh actress (d. 1995)
1946 – Gonzalo Márquez, Venezuelan baseball player (d. 1984)
  1946   – Bob Russell, English politician
1947 – Augustin Banyaga, Rwandan-American mathematician and academic
  1947   – Wendy Overton, American tennis player
  1947   – Kristian Blak, Danish-Faroese pianist, composer, and producer 
  1947   – Don Foster, English academic and politician
  1947   – César Gaviria, Colombian economist and politician, 36th President of Colombia
  1947   – Eliyahu M. Goldratt, Israeli physicist and economist (d. 2011)
1948 – Gary Doer, Canadian politician and diplomat, 20th Premier of Manitoba
  1948   – Al Gore, American soldier and politician, 45th Vice President of the United States and Nobel Prize laureate
  1948   – Rhea Perlman, American actress 
  1948   – Gustaaf Van Cauter, Belgian cyclist
1949 – Gilles Gilbert, Canadian ice hockey player
1950 – András Adorján, Hungarian chess player and author
  1950   – Ed Marinaro, American football player and actor
  1950   – Sandra Morgen, American anthropologist and academic (d. 2016)
1953 – Dennis Kamakahi, American guitarist and composer (d. 2014)
1955 – Svetozar Marović, President of Serbia and Montenegro
  1955   – Angus Young, Scottish-Australian guitarist and songwriter
1957 – Alan Duncan, English businessman and politician, former Shadow Leader of the House of Commons
1959 – Markus Hediger, Swiss poet and translator
1961 – Ron Brown, American sprinter and football player
  1961   – Howard Gordon, American screenwriter and producer
1962 – Olli Rehn, Finnish footballer and politician
  1962   – Georgios Stefanopoulos, Greek boxer 
1963 – Paul Mercurio, Australian actor and dancer
1964 – Mark Hoban, English accountant and politician
1965 – Tom Barrasso, American ice hockey player and coach
  1965   – Patty Fendick, American tennis player and coach
  1965   – Jean-Christophe Lafaille, French mountaineer (d. 2006)
  1965   – William McNamara, American actor and producer
  1965   – Steven T. Seagle, American author and screenwriter
1966 – Roger Black, English runner and journalist
  1966   – Nick Firestone, American race car driver
1968 – César Sampaio, Brazilian footballer
1969 – Nyamko Sabuni, Burundian-Swedish politician
  1969   – Steve Smith, American basketball player and sportscaster
1970 – Alenka Bratušek, Slovenian politician, 7th Prime Minister of Slovenia
1971 – Demetris Assiotis, Cypriot footballer
  1971   – Martin Atkinson, English footballer and referee
  1971   – Pavel Bure, Russian ice hockey player
  1971   – Craig McCracken, American animator, producer, and screenwriter
  1971   – Ewan McGregor, Scottish actor
1972 – Alejandro Amenábar, Chilean-Spanish director and screenwriter
  1972   – Andrew Bowen, American actor, producer, and screenwriter
  1972   – Luca Gentili, Italian footballer and coach
  1972   – Hristos Polihroniou, Greek hammer thrower 
  1972   – Evan Williams, American businessman, co-founded Twitter and Pyra Labs
1973 – Christopher Hampson, English ballet dancer and choreographer
1974 – Benjamin Eicher, German director, producer, and screenwriter
  1974   – Natali, Russian singer, composer and songwriter
  1974   – Stefan Olsdal, Swedish bass player 
  1974   – Jani Sievinen, Finnish swimmer
1975 – Makis Dreliozis, Greek basketball player 
  1975   – Adam Green, American director, producer, and screenwriter
  1975   – Nathan Grey, Australian rugby player and coach
  1975   – Cameron Murray, Scottish rugby player
  1975   – Ryan Rupe, American baseball player
1976 – Howard Frier, American basketball player
  1976   – Igors Sļesarčuks, Latvian-Russian footballer
  1976   – Graeme Smith, Scottish swimmer
1977 – Toshiya, Japanese bass player, songwriter, and producer
  1977   – Garth Tander, Australian race car driver
1978 – Michael Clark, Australian cricketer and footballer
  1978   – Stephen Clemence, English footballer and manager 
  1978   – Jarrod Cooper, American football player
  1978   – Jérôme Rothen, French footballer
1979 – Omri Afek, Israeli footballer
  1979   – Euan Burton, Scottish martial artist and coach
  1979   – Alexis Ferrero, Argentinian footballer
  1979   – Charlie Manning, American baseball player
  1979   – Jonna Mendes, American skier
  1979   – Rhys Wesser, Australian rugby league player
1980 – Martin Albrechtsen, Danish footballer
  1980   – Karolina Lassbo, Swedish lawyer and blogger
  1980   – Matias Concha, Swedish footballer
  1980   – Kate Micucci, American singer-songwriter, guitarist, and actress 
  1980   – Michael Ryder, Canadian ice hockey player
  1980   – Maaya Sakamoto, Japanese actress, voice actress and singer
1981 – Ryan Bingham, American singer-songwriter and guitarist
  1981   – Thomas Chatelle, Belgian footballer
  1981   – Han Tae-you, South Korean footballer
  1981   – Pa Dembo Touray, Gambian footballer
  1981   – Maarten van der Weijden, Dutch swimmer
1982 – Tal Ben Haim, Israeli footballer
  1982   – Bam Childress, American football player
  1982   – Brian Tyree Henry, American actor
  1982   – Audrey Kawasaki, American painter
  1982   – Chien-Ming Wang, Taiwanese baseball player
1983 – Hashim Amla, South African cricketer
  1983   – Ashleigh Ball, Canadian voice actress and musician
  1983   – Sophie Hunger, Swiss-German musician
  1983   – Vlasios Maras, Greek gymnast
  1983   – Nigel Plum, Australian rugby league player
1984 – David Clarkson, Canadian ice hockey player
  1984   – Eddie Johnson, American soccer player 
  1984   – James Jones, American football player
  1984   – Martins Dukurs, Latvian sled racer
  1984   – Kaie Kand, Estonian heptathlete
  1984   – Alberto Junior Rodríguez, Peruvian footballer
  1984   – Ed Williamson, English rugby player
1985 – Steve Bernier, Canadian ice hockey player
  1985   – Jo-Lonn Dunbar, American football player
  1985   – Jesper Hansen, Danish footballer
  1985   – Ivan Mishyn, Ukrainian race car driver
  1985   – Kory Sheets, American football player
  1985   – Jalmar Sjöberg, Swedish wrestler
1986 – Andreas Dober, Austrian footballer
  1986   – James King, Scottish rugby player
  1986   – Paulo Machado, Portuguese footballer
1987 – Nordin Amrabat, Dutch footballer
  1987   – Hugo Ayala, Mexican footballer
  1987   – Amaury Bischoff, Portuguese footballer
  1987   – Humpy Koneru, Indian chess player
  1987   – Kirill Starkov, Danish ice hockey player
  1987   – Nelli Zhiganshina, Russian figure skater
1988 – Thomas De Corte, Belgian footballer
  1988   – Conrad Sewell, Australian singer and songwriter
  1988   – Dorin Dickerson, American football player
  1988   – DeAndre Liggins, American basketball player
  1988   – Louis van der Westhuizen, Namibian cricketer
1989 – Alberto Martín Romo García Adámez, Spanish footballer
  1989   – Nejc Vidmar, Slovenian footballer
  1989   – Liu Zige, Chinese swimmer
1990 – George Iloka, American football player
  1990   – Lyra McKee, Irish journalist (d. 2019)
  1990   – Sandra Roma, Swedish tennis player
1991 – Milan Milanović, Serbian footballer
  1991   – Rodney Sneijder, Dutch footballer
1992 – Stijn de Looijer, Dutch footballer
  1992   – Adam Zampa, Australian cricketer
1993 – Mikael Ishak, Swedish footballer
1994 – Samira Asghari, Afghan member of the International Olympic Committee
  1994   – Tyler Wright, Australian surfer
  1994   – Mads Würtz Schmidt, Danish road cyclist
1995 – Fiona Brown, footballer
1996 – Liza Koshy, American actress, comedian, and television host
1998 – Jakob Chychrun, American-born Canadian ice hockey player
1999 – Japhet Tanganga, English footballer 
  1999   – Brooke Scullion, Irish Singer 
  1999   – Jens Odgaard, Danish professional footballer 
  1999   – Denys Strekalin, Ukrainian-born pair skater who competes for France 
  1999   – Adam Chrzanowski, Polish professional footballer 
  1999   – Santiago Chocobares, Argentine rugby union player who plays for the Jaguares 
  1999   – Ballou Tabla, Canadian professional soccer player 
  1999   – Elžbieta Kropa, Lithuanian figure skater 
  1999   – Edon Zhegrova, German born professional footballer 
  1999   – Shiann Salmon, Jamaican track and field athlete 
  1999   – Ben Williams, Welsh professional footballer 
  1999   – Luca Pizzul, Italian professional footballer 
  1999   – Sander Raieste, Estonian professional basketball player 
  1999   – Jonas Røndbjerg, Danish professional ice hockey forward 
  1999   – Adele Tan, Singaporean sports shooter 
  1999   – Nuno Pina, Portuguese football player 
  1999   – Tereza Jančová, former alpine skier from Slovakia 
  1999   – Maren Lutz, German female canoeist 
  1999   – Shehana Vithana, Sri Lankan born Australian professional squash player 
  1999   – Providence Cowdrill,  English cricketer 
  1999   – Ricardo Felipe, Brazilian footballer 
  1999   – Dimitris Dalakouras, Greek professional footballer 
2004 – Samson Baidoo, Austrian professional footballer 
  2004   – Gleb Lutfullin, Russian figure skater 
  2004   – Feng He, Chinese snowboarder 
  2004   – Mateo Sanabria, Argentine professional footballer 
  2004   – Alex Luna, Argentine professional footballer 
2005 – Reed Baker-Whiting, American professional footballer 
2014 – Eva Diana Kidisyuk,Ukrainian-American YouTuber

Deaths

Pre-1600
32 BC – Titus Pomponius Atticus, Roman nobleman of the Equestrian order (b. 109 BC)
 528 – Xiaoming, emperor of Northern Wei (b. 510)
 963 – Abu Ja'far Ahmad ibn Muhammad, Saffarid emir (b. 906)
1241 – Pousa, voivode of Transylvania
1251 – William of Modena, Italian bishop and diplomat
1340 – Ivan I of Moscow, Russian Grand Duke (b. 1288)
1342 – Dionigi di Borgo San Sepolcro, Italian Augustinian monk
1462 – Isidore II of Constantinople, patriarch of Constantinople
1491 – Bonaventura Tornielli, Italian Roman Catholic priest (b. 1411)
1547 – Francis I, French king (b. 1494)
1567 – Philip I, Landgrave of Hesse (b. 1504)

1601–1900
1621 – Philip III, Spanish king (b. 1578)
1622 – Gonzalo Méndez de Canço, Royal Governor of La Florida (b. 1554)
1631 – John Donne, English lawyer and poet (b. 1572)
1671 – Anne Hyde, wife of James II of England (b. 1637)
1723 – Edward Hyde, 3rd Earl of Clarendon, English soldier and politician, 14th Colonial Governor of New York (b. 1661)
1741 – Pieter Burman the Elder, Dutch scholar and author (b. 1668)
1751 – Frederick, Prince of Wales, Hanoverian-born heir to the British throne (b. 1707)
1797 – Olaudah Equiano, Nigerian merchant, author, and activist (b.1745)
1837 – John Constable, English painter and educator (b. 1776)
1850 – John C. Calhoun, American lawyer and politician, 7th Vice President of the United States (b. 1782)
1855 – Charlotte Brontë, English novelist and poet (b. 1816)
1877 – Antoine Augustin Cournot, French mathematician and philosopher (b. 1801)
1880 – Henryk Wieniawski, Polish violinist and composer (b. 1835)
1885 – Franz Abt, German composer and conductor (b. 1819)

1901–present
1907 – Galusha A. Grow, American lawyer and politician, 28th Speaker of the United States House of Representatives (b. 1823)
1910 – Jean Moréas, Greek poet, essayist and art critic (b. 1856)
1913 – J. P. Morgan, American banker and financier (b. 1837)
1915 – Wyndham Halswelle, English-Scottish runner and captain (b. 1882)
1917 – Emil von Behring, German physiologist and immunologist, Nobel Prize laureate (b. 1854)
1920 – Abdul Hamid Madarshahi, Bengali Islamic scholar and author (b. 1869)
1924 – George Charles Haité, English painter and illustrator (b. 1855)
1927 – Kang Youwei, Chinese scholar and political reformer (b. 1858)
1930 – Ludwig Schüler, German politician, Mayor of Marburg (b. 1836)
1931 – Knute Rockne, American football player and coach (b. 1888)
1935 – Georges V. Matchabelli, Georgian-American businessman and diplomat, founded Prince Matchabelli perfume (b. 1885)
1939 – Ioannis Tsangaridis, Greek general (b. 1887)
1944 – Mineichi Koga, Japanese admiral (b. 1885)
1945 – Frank Findlay, New Zealand banker and politician (b. 1884)
  1945   – Hans Fischer, German chemist and academic, Nobel Prize laureate (b. 1881)
1950 – Robert Natus, Estonian architect (b. 1890)
1952 – Wallace H. White, Jr., American lawyer and politician (b. 1877)
1956 – Ralph DePalma, Italian-American race car driver and actor (b. 1884)
  1956   – Nellah Massey Bailey, American politician and librarian (b. 1893)
1961 – Pyrros Spyromilios, officer of the Greek Navy and director of the Greek Radio Orchestra (b. 1913) 
1968 – Grover Lowdermilk, American baseball player (b. 1885)
1970 – Semyon Timoshenko, Soviet Commander during the Winter War and the Eastern Front of World War II (b. 1894)
1975 – Percy Alliss, English golfer (b. 1897)
1976 – Paul Strand, American photographer and director (b. 1890)
1978 – Astrid Allwyn, American actress (b. 1905)
  1978   – Charles Herbert Best, American-Canadian physiologist and biochemist, co-discovered Insulin (b. 1899)
1980 – Vladimír Holan, Czech poet and author (b. 1905)
  1980   – Jesse Owens, American sprinter and long jumper (b. 1913)
1981 – Enid Bagnold, English author and playwright (b. 1889)
1983 – Christina Stead, Australian author and academic (b. 1902)
1986 – Jerry Paris, American actor and director (b. 1925)
1988 – William McMahon, Australian lawyer and politician, 20th Prime Minister of Australia (b. 1908)
1991 – Theofylaktos Papakonstantinou, Greek columnist, political and social analyst and historian (b. 1905) 
1993 – Brandon Lee, American actor and martial artist (b. 1965)
  1993   – Mitchell Parish, Lithuanian-American songwriter (b. 1900)
1995 – Selena, American singer-songwriter (b. 1971)
1996 – Dante Giacosa, Italian automobile designer and engineer (b. 1905)
  1996   – Jeffrey Lee Pierce, American singer-songwriter and guitarist (b. 1958)
1998 – Bella Abzug, American lawyer, activist, and politician (b. 1920)
  1998   – Tim Flock, American race car driver (b. 1924)
  1998   – Joel Ryce-Menuhin, American pianist (b. 1933)
1999 – Yuri Knorozov, Russian linguist and ethnographer (b. 1922)
2000 – Gisèle Freund, German-born French photographer and photojournalist (b. 1908)
  2000   – Adrian Fisher, English guitarist and member of the band Toby (b. 1952)
2001 – David Rocastle, English footballer (b. 1967)
  2001   – Clifford Shull, American physicist and academic, Nobel Prize laureate (b. 1915)
2002 – Barry Took, English comedian, actor, and screenwriter (b. 1928)
  2002   – Moturu Udayam, Indian activist and politician (b. 1924)
  2002   – Carlos J. Gradin, Argentine Archaeologist (b. 1913)
2003 – Harold Scott MacDonald Coxeter, English-Canadian mathematician and academic (b. 1907)
  2003   – Anne Gwynne, American actress (b. 1918)
  2003   – Tommy Seebach, Danish singer-songwriter, pianist, and producer (b. 1949)
2004 – Scott Helvenston, American soldier (b. 1965)
2005 – Stanley J. Korsmeyer, American oncologist and academic (b. 1951)
  2005   – Justiniano Montano, Filipino lawyer and politician (b. 1905)
  2005   – Frank Perdue, American businessman (b. 1920)
2006 – Jackie McLean, American saxophonist and composer (b. 1931)
2007 – Paul Watzlawick, Austrian-American psychologist and philosopher (b. 1921)
2008 – Jules Dassin, American director, producer, screenwriter, and actor (b. 1911)
  2008   – Bill Keightley, American equipment manager (b. 1926)
2009 – Raúl Alfonsín, Argentinian lawyer and politician, 46th President of Argentina (b. 1927)
  2009   – Choor Singh, Indian-Singaporean lawyer and judge (b. 1911)
2010 – Jerald terHorst, American journalist (b. 1922)
  2010   – Roger Addison, Welsh rugby union player (b. 1945)
2011 – Gil Clancy, American boxer and trainer (b. 1922)
  2011   – Alan Fitzgerald, Australian journalist and author (b. 1935)
  2011   – Mary Greyeyes, the first First Nations woman to join the Canadian Armed Forces (b. 1920)
  2011   – Oddvar Hansen, Norwegian footballer and coach (b. 1921)
  2011   – Ishbel MacAskill, Scottish singer and actress (b. 1941)
  2011   – Henry Taub, American businessman and philanthropist (b. 1927)
2012 – Judith Adams, New Zealand-Australian nurse and politician (b. 1943)
  2012   – Dale R. Corson, American physicist and academic (b. 1914)
  2012   – Bernard O. Gruenke, American stained glass artist (b. 1914)
  2012   – Jerry Lynch, American baseball player (b. 1930)
  2012   – Alberto Sughi, Italian painter (b. 1928)
  2012   – Halbert White, American economist and academic (b. 1950)
2013 – Charles Amarin Brand, French archbishop (b. 1920)
  2013   – Ernie Bridge, Australian singer and politician (b. 1936)
  2013   – Bob Clarke, American illustrator (b. 1926)
  2013   – Ahmad Sayyed Javadi, Iranian lawyer and politician, Iranian Minister of Interior (b. 1917)
  2013   – Dmitri Uchaykin, Russian ice hockey player (b. 1980)
2014 – Gonzalo Anes, Spanish economist, historian, and academic (b. 1931)
  2014   – Roger Somville, Belgian painter (b. 1923)
2015 – Betty Churcher, Australian painter, historian, and curator (b. 1931)
  2015   – Cocoa Fujiwara, Japanese author and illustrator (b. 1983)
  2015   – Carlos Gaviria Díaz, Colombian lawyer and politician (b. 1937)
  2015   – Dalibor Vesely, Czech-English historian, author, and academic (b. 1934)
2016 – Ronnie Corbett, Scottish comedian, actor and screenwriter (b. 1930)
  2016   – Hans-Dietrich Genscher, German politician (b. 1927)
  2016   – Zaha Hadid, Iraqi-born English architect and academic, designed the Bridge Pavilion (b. 1950)
  2016   – Imre Kertész, Hungarian author, Nobel Prize laureate (b. 1929)
  2016   – Denise Robertson, British writer and television broadcaster (b. 1932)
2017 – Gilbert Baker, American artist and LGBT rights activist (b. 1951)
  2017   – James Rosenquist, American artist (b. 1933)
2018 – Nick Newton,  inventor of the Newton Starting Blocks (b. 1933)
2019 – Nipsey Hussle, American rapper (b. 1985)
2020 – Gita Ramjee, Ugandan-South African scientist and researcher (b. 1956) 
2021 – Ken Reitz, American baseball player (b. 1951)
  2021   – Muhammad Wakkas, Bangladeshi teacher and parliamentarian (b. 1952)
2022 –  Shirley Burkovich, former American All-American Girls Professional Baseball League (AAGPBL) player (b. 1933)
  2022   – Patrick Demarchelier, French fashion photographer (b. 1943)
  2022   – Moana Jackson,  New Zealand lawyer specialising in constitutional law (b. 1945)

Holidays and observances
 Cesar Chavez Day (United States)
 Christian feast day
 Abdas of Susa
 Acathius of Melitene (Eastern Orthodox Church)
 Anesius and companions
 Benjamin
 Balbina
 John Donne (Anglican Communion, Lutheran)
 March 31 (Eastern Orthodox liturgics)
 Day of Genocide of Azerbaijanis (Azerbaijan)
 Freedom Day (Malta)
 International Transgender Day of Visibility
 King Nangklao Memorial Day (Thailand)
 Thomas Mundy Peterson Day (New Jersey, United States)
 Transfer Day (US Virgin Islands)
 World Backup Day

References

External links

 BBC: On This Day
 
 Historical Events on March 31

Days of the year
March